William Richard Cutter (August 17, 1847 – June 6, 1918) was an American historian, genealogist, and writer.

Life 
Born in Woburn, Massachusetts on August 17, 1847, he was the son of Dr. Benjamin Cutter and Mary Whittemore Cutter. He attended the Woburn Public School and the Warren Academy. He developed an interest in genealogy and history from his father, and was able to conduct further research while at Yale University, building upon the genealogy of the Cutter family and historical documents begun by his father. He received his Master of Arts degree from Norwich University.

He was married to Mary Elizabeth Kimball and lived in Lexington, Massachusetts. They had a daughter, Sarah, who was born in 1873 and died in 1890. Cutter died on June 6, 1918 in Woburn.

Career 

He was a secretary of the Trustees of Warren Academy. He was a member of the Massachusetts Society of Colonial Wars. He also served as President of the Rumford Historical Association. He was a member of the New England Historic Genealogical Society until 1911.

Bibliography 

His notable books are:

 A History of the Cutter Family of New England
 Historic homes and places and genealogical and personal memoirs relating to the families of Middlesex County, Massachusetts
 Genealogical and personal memoirs relating to the families of the state of Massachusetts
 Encyclopedia of Massachusetts: Biographical-Genealogical 
 New England Families, Genealogical and Memorial

References

External links
 William Richard Cutter, at the University of Pennsylvania library
 William Richard Cutter, Library of Congress online catalog
 WR Cutter, Google Scholar
 

1847 births
1918 deaths
Yale University alumni
Norwich University alumni
American genealogists
People from Woburn, Massachusetts
Historians from Massachusetts